Julie Belhamri (born 4 April 1994) is a French modern pentathlete.

She participated at the 2018 World Modern Pentathlon Championships, winning a medal.

References

External links

Living people
1994 births
French female modern pentathletes
World Modern Pentathlon Championships medalists
21st-century French women